Statistics of Swiss Super League in the 1956–57 season.

Overview
It was contested by 14 teams, and BSC Young Boys won the championship. FC Zürich and FC Schaffhausen were both relegated down to the second division.

League standings

Results

References

Sources
 Switzerland 1956–57 at RSSSF

Swiss Football League seasons
Swiss
1956–57 in Swiss football